Samanabad (Punjabi) is an administrative zone in Lahore, Punjab, Pakistan. It forms one of 10 zones of the Lahore metropolitan area.

Neighbourhoods

References

Samanabad Zone